The 1939–40 season was intended to be the forty-fifth season in which Dundee competed at a Scottish national level, and the second season playing in the second tier. After just 4 league games however, the Scottish Football League suspended its competition on 13 September 1939 after the outbreak of World War II. A month later, Dundee would join the Eastern Division of the Scottish War Emergency League for the rest of the season. Dundee would also compete in the Scottish War Emergency Cup in lieu of the suspended Scottish Cup, and were knocked out in the 1st round by Third Lanark over two legs. The club would retire from club football until 1944 due to the ongoing war.

Scottish Division Two 

Statistics provided by Dee Archive.

Scottish War Emergency League 

Statistics provided by Dee Archive.

Emergency League table

Scottish War Emergency Cup 

Statistics provided by Dee Archive.

Player Statistics 
Statistics provided by Dee Archive

|}

See also 

 List of Dundee F.C. seasons

References

External links 

 1939-40 Dundee season on Fitbastats

Dundee F.C. seasons
Dundee